
Aunia Marie Kahn (born December 5, 1977) is an American artist, photographer, author, designer, digital marketer and inspirational speaker. She was born and raised in Detroit, Michigan, and currently lives in Eugene, Oregon. She is also the founder of Rise Visible and Create for Healing. 

Kahn originally began creating art as a therapeutic response to a difficult upbringing as well as chronic illnesses (Ehlers–Danlos syndromes, Mast cell activation syndrome, Dysautonomia), rather than through a wish to build a career as an artist. At the urging of a friend, her work was first exhibited publicly in December 2005 as part of the Voices Within Surviving Through the Arts show mounted by the St. Louis Artists' Guild. Her work has been in over 300+ exhibitions in over 10 countries; at places such as San Diego Art Institute, Los Angeles Center for Digital Art, IMOCA, St. Louis Art Museum, Contemporary Art Museum St. Louis, Mitchell Museum, and the Jordan Schnitzer Museum of Art.  She has garnered several awards, having been featured in numerous publications, and represented and collected nationally and internationally, along with being a published author has provided her a platform to guest lectures at colleges and universities. She also undertakes commissions and other collaborative projects.

Entirely self-taught, her work blends elements of photography, digital painting and collagedue to her severe allergic reaction disease Mast cell activation syndrome where she has had to avoid most mediums due to life-threatening interactions. In 2018, with medical intervention and a proper diagnosis, Kahn also now works in colored pencil and watercolor. Her art frequently features figurative subjects juxtaposed with symbols and nature. Representations of surgical instruments, human anatomy and mortality are common features. Some of her work includes aspects of self-portraiture and incorporates likenesses of herself as a way to explore her personal challenges through creativity.

An interest in tarot led to the creation of the Silver Era Tarot deck, made up of original designs featuring Kahn and author Russell J. Moon, published by Schiffer Publishing in April 2010.

In October 2010 Kahn curated the Lowbrow Tarot Project, a collection of pieces loosely centered on the lowbrow art style, representing the 22 cards of the Major Arcana and a 23rd piece representing the back of the cards. The works were exhibited at La Luz de Jesus gallery, Los Angeles, California, and were published as a coffee table book and a card deck. As well as Kahn herself, artists featured included Molly Crabapple, David Stoupakis, Chet Zar, Angie Mason, Daniel Martin Diaz and Chris Mars.

Her piece Rousing the Whirlwind was chosen by Les Bourgeois vineyard, Rocheport, Missouri, to appear on the label of its limited edition 2005 Syrah. The wine went on sale in 2007.

Bibliography 
 The Art of Aunia Kahn, Alexi Era Publishing, 2018 
 Obvious Remote Chaos, Old Line Publishing, 2010 
 The Silver Era Tarot, Schiffer Publishing, 2010 
 Lowbrow Tarot: An Artistic Collaborative Effort in Honor of Tarot, Schiffer Publishing, 2012 
 Lowbrow Tarot: Major Arcana Cards, Schiffer Publishing, 2012 
 Inspirations for Survivors, Schiffer Publishing, 2012 
 The Witch's Oracle, Schiffer Publishing, 2014 
 Tarot Under Oath, Alexi Era Gallery, 2014 
 The Witch's Oracle 2nd Edition, Red Feather Publishing, 2019 
 Avalanche of White Reason: The Photography & Writings of Aunia Kahn, Lokreign, 2015

Curated Shows
 All Exhibitions, Alexi Era Gallery, Eugene, 2012–2017
 Tarot Under Oath, Last Rites Gallery, New York NY, 2014
 Touched By Violence, Framations Gallery, St. Louis, 2013
 Moon Goddess, Modern Eden Gallery, San Francisco, 2012
 The Lowbrow Tarot Project, La Luz de Jesus, Los Angeles, 2010
 Darkest Dreams a Lighted Way, Fort Gondo Compound for the Arts, St. Louis, 2008
 The Beauty From Within, ArtDimensions Gallery, St. Louis, 2006
 Art of Being a Woman, ArtDimensions Gallery, St. Louis, 2006

Selected Press
 Art That Creeps, Strychnin Gallery and Korero, 2009, pp. 88–95 
 Mynameis issue 8, Graphotism, 2010, pp. 136–157
 Photographer's Forum, Best of College Photography, Serbin Communications, 2009, p. 64

References

External links
 Aunia Kahn website
 Artist Interview Aunia Kahn
 Diversity & Inclusion in the Workplace
 Video interview with Aunia Kahn

1977 births
Living people
21st-century American women artists
Artists from Illinois
American contemporary artists
Artists from Detroit
Mixed-media artists